The Midtown Historic District is a historic district in the city of Mobile, Alabama, United States. It was placed on the National Register of Historic Places on November 29, 2001, with a small boundary increase on November 18, 2020  It is roughly bounded by Taylor Avenue, Government Street, Houston Street, Kenneth Street, Springhill Avenue, and Florida Street. The majority of the contributing buildings range in age from the 1880s to the 1950s and cover a wide variety of architectural styles. The district was significantly affected by a tornado on December 25, 2012.

Gallery

References

Historic districts in Mobile, Alabama
National Register of Historic Places in Mobile, Alabama
Spanish Revival architecture in Alabama
Historic districts on the National Register of Historic Places in Alabama